Terence Owen Vancooten (born 29 December 1997) is a professional footballer who plays as a defender for  club Stevenage. Born in England, he represents the Guyana national team.

Following spells at various youth academies, Vancooten joined Staines Town in 2014 and established himself in the first-team during the 2015–16 season. He joined Championship club Reading in the summer of 2016, and was also loaned out to Billericay Town and Basingstoke Town during his time there. He signed for Stevenage in July 2017.

Early life
Born in Kingston upon Thames, England, Vancooten is of Guyanese descent. He attended Christ's School in Richmond, London.

Club career

Early career
Vancooten began his career at Hampton & Richmond Borough, before joining Leatherhead's youth system, competing in the West Surrey under-16 league. It was at Leatherhead where Vancooten was scouted by Brentford, joining the west London club in 2014 after a successful trial period. After a brief spell at Brentford, he then joined Staines Town at academy level in early 2014, where he also represented the Middlesex FA. He played regularly in the club's academy and subsequently began to play for the first-team during the 2015–16 season, making 10 appearances in all competitions.

He signed for Championship club Reading ahead of the 2016–17 season, and was placed in their under-23 development squad for the season. After making three appearances for the under-23 team, Vancooten was loaned out to Billericay Town in November 2016 for the remainder of the year. He made five appearances during his time at Billericay before returning to his parent club. Vancooten was loaned out once again on 25 February 2017, this time joining Southern League Premier Division club Basingstoke Town for the remainder of the 2016–17 season. He made nine appearances for Basingstoke. At the end of the season, Vancooten was released by Reading.

Stevenage
Following his release from Reading, Vancooten spent several weeks on trial at League Two club Stevenage, playing in all of the Hertfordshire club's early pre-season fixtures. The trial period was successful, and he signed a one-year contract, with the option of a further year, on 18 July 2017. On joining the club, Vancooten stated "I can't wait to learn off everyone and improve myself as a player. I have already taken in so much. Both the players and management have been brilliant for me so I am confident I am at the right place". He made his professional Football League debut on 26 August 2017, coming on as an 83rd-minute substitute as 10-man Stevenage held on to secure a 1–0 away victory at local rivals Barnet. After establishing himself in the first-team over the next two months, Vancooten signed an "improved and extended" deal with Stevenage in October 2017. He made 24 appearances during the 2017–18 season.

Vancooten played just nine times during the first half of the 2018–19 season. Having not played for over three months, he returned to the first-team when he played the whole match in Stevenage's 2–0 away win at Grimsby Town on 6 April 2019. He went on to play every minute of the club's last six matches of the season, of which they won five and drew one, as Stevenage missed out on a play-off place after finishing in 10th position in League Two. He made 15 appearances during his second season with the club. Vancooten received a PFA Community award in April 2019 for his contribution in the local community in Stevenage. He signed a "new and improved" contract with Stevenage on 13 August 2019, with the new agreement running until 2022. He went on to make 20 appearances during the 2019–20 season, which was curtailed in March 2020 due to the COVID-19 pandemic. Vancooten played a further 33 times throughout the 2020–21 season as Stevenage finished the League Two season in 14th position. He signed a new two-year contract extension with Stevenage on 5 August 2021. Vancooten scored his first goal in senior club football in Stevenage's 3–0 victory against Wycombe Wanderers in the EFL Trophy on 20 September 2022.

International career
In October 2017, Vancooten was called up to play for Guyana in a friendly away at Grenada. He started the match, on 7 October 2017, which ended in a 1–0 defeat. Vancooten was named in Guyana's 23-man squad for the 2019 CONCACAF Gold Cup, the country's first appearance at a major international tournament. He played in all three of Guyana's matches in the tournament as they finished in third place in their group. Vancooten scored his first goal for Guyana in a 4–0 home victory over Bahamas during a 2022 FIFA World Cup qualifier on 30 March 2021. The goal was also Vancooten's first in senior football.

Style of play
Vancooten has played in every position across the defence. Initially deployed as a defensive midfielder in the early stages of his career, he has then been utilised as a defender. This firstly involved playing as a full-back, before playing regularly as a centre-back for Stevenage. Vancooten's speed and composure on the ball have been highlighted as his main strengths, having a tendency to bring the ball out from defence.

Career statistics

Club

International
Source:

References

External links

1997 births
Living people
English footballers
Guyanese footballers
Guyana international footballers
English people of Guyanese descent
Association football defenders
Staines Town F.C. players
Reading F.C. players
Billericay Town F.C. players
Basingstoke Town F.C. players
Stevenage F.C. players
English Football League players
Isthmian League players
Southern Football League players
Footballers from Kingston upon Thames
2019 CONCACAF Gold Cup players